The Directorate-General for the Naval Intelligence (reporting name: DGNI), unofficially as Naval Intelligence or Nav Intel, is the military intelligence agency within the Pakistan Navy tasked with primarily the Navy's modernization efforts and advancing knowledge of protecting Nation's interests from seaborne attacks.

The Naval Intelligence is tasked with primary objective of providing critical information to the Pakistani military's combat branches ranging from gather advanced knowledge on threats of terrorism and briefing on potential targets to the Marines Recon teams and the Special Service Group Navy (SSGN).

References

Pakistani intelligence agencies
N
Naval intelligence
1960 establishments in Pakistan
Government agencies established in 1960